Alan van Coller (born 10 September 1967) is a South African sprint canoer who competed in the early to mid-2000s. Competing in two Summer Olympics, he earned his best finish of eighth in the K-1 500 m event at Sydney in 2000. He was born in Johannesburg.

References
Sports-Reference.com profile

1967 births
Sportspeople from Johannesburg
Canoeists at the 2000 Summer Olympics
Canoeists at the 2004 Summer Olympics
Living people
Olympic canoeists of South Africa
South African male canoeists